Kate Griffin may refer to:

 Kate Obenshain Griffin, former chairwoman of the Republican Party of Virginia
 Katie Griffin, Canadian actress, voice actress, and singer
 Kate Griffin, a pseudonym used by fantasy author Catherine Webb
 Kathy Griffin, American stand-up comedian and actress